In astrophysics, the Lane–Emden equation is a dimensionless form of Poisson's equation for the gravitational potential of a Newtonian self-gravitating, spherically symmetric, polytropic fluid. It is named after astrophysicists Jonathan Homer Lane and Robert Emden. The index  is the polytropic index that appears in the polytropic equation of state,

 

Solutions thus describe the run of pressure and density with radius and are known as polytropes of index . If an isothermal fluid (polytropic index tends to infinity) is used instead of a polytropic fluid, one obtains the Emden–Chandrasekhar equation.

Applications 
Physically, hydrostatic equilibrium connects the gradient of the potential, the density, and the gradient of the pressure, whereas Poisson's equation connects the potential with the density. Thus, if we have a further equation that dictates how the pressure and density vary with respect to one another, we can reach a solution. The particular choice of a polytropic gas as given above makes the mathematical statement of the problem particularly succinct and leads to the Lane–Emden equation. The equation is a useful approximation for self-gravitating spheres of plasma such as stars, but typically it is a rather limiting assumption.

Derivation

From hydrostatic equilibrium 
Consider a self-gravitating, spherically symmetric fluid in hydrostatic equilibrium. Mass is conserved and thus described by the continuity equation

 

The equation of hydrostatic equilibrium is

 

Differentiating again gives

 

where the continuity equation has been used to replace the mass gradient.

 

Dividing both sides by  yields, in some sense, a dimensional form of the desired equation.

 

Gathering the constants and substituting , where

 

we have the Lane–Emden equation,

From Poisson's equation 

Equivalently, one can start with Poisson's equation,

 

One can replace the gradient of the potential using the hydrostatic equilibrium, via

 

which again yields the dimensional form of the Lane–Emden equation.

Exact solutions
In general, the Lane–Emden equation must be solved numerically to find .

For a given solution , the density profile is given by

 .

The pressure can be found using the polytropic equation of state, i.e.

 

The temperature profile is then given by

 

In spherically symmetric cases, the Lane–Emden equation is integrable for only three values of the polytropic index .

For n = 0 
If , the equation becomes

 

Re-arranging and integrating once gives

 

 

Therefore,

For n = 1 
When , the equation can be expanded in the form

 

One assumes a power series solution:

This leads to a recursive relationship for the expansion coefficients:

This relation can be solved leading to the general solution:

 

This requires that , thus leading to the solution:

For n = 5 
We start from with the Lane–Emden equation:

 

Rewriting for  produces:

 

Differentiating with respect to ξ leads to:

 

Reduced, we come by:

 

Therefore, the Lane–Emden equation has the solution

 

when . This solution is finite in mass but infinite in radial extent, and therefore the complete polytrope does not represent a physical solution. Chandrasekhar believed for a long time that finding other solution for  "is complicated and involves elliptic integrals".

Srivastava's solution
In 1962, Sambhunath Srivastava found an explicit solution when . His solution is given by

and from this solution, a family of solutions  can be obtained using homology transformation. Since this solution does not satisfy the conditions at the origin (in fact, it is oscillatory with amplitudes growing indefinitely as the origin is approached), this solution can be used in composite stellar models.

Analytic solutions 
In applications, the main role play analytic solutions that are expressible by the convergent power series expanded around some initial point. One can prove  that the equation has the convergent power series/analytic solution around the origin of the form
.

The radius of convergence of this series is limited due to existence  of two singularities on the imaginary axis in the complex plane. These singularities are located symmetrically with respect to the origin. Their position change when we change equation parameters and the initial condition , and therefore, they are called movable singularities due to classification of the singularities of non-linear ordinary differential equations in the complex plane by Paul Painlevé. A similar structure of singularities appears in other non-linear equations that result from the reduction of the Laplace operator in spherical symmetry, e.g., Isothermal Sphere equation.

Analytic solutions can be extended along the real line by analytic continuation procedure resulting in the full profile of the star or molecular cloud cores. Two analytic solutions with the overlapping circles of convergence can also be matched on the overlap to the larger domain solution, which is a commonly used method of construction of profiles of required properties.

The series solution is also used in the numerical integration of the equation. It is used to shift the initial data for analytic solution slightly away from the origin since at the origin the numerical methods fail due to the singularity of the equation.

Numerical solutions 
In general, solutions are found by numerical integration. Many standard methods require that the problem is formulated as a system of first-order ordinary differential equations. For example,

 

The first equation represents hydrostatic equilibrium and the second represents mass conservation.

Homologous variables

Homology-invariant equation 
Solutions that are related in this way are called homologous; the process that transforms them is homology. If one chooses variables that are invariant to homology, then we can reduce the order of the Lane–Emden equation by one.

A variety of such variables exist. A suitable choice is

 

and

 

 
and
 .

 

This is now a single first-order equation.

Topology of the homology-invariant equation 

The homology-invariant equation can be regarded as the autonomous pair of equations

 

and

 

The behaviour of solutions to these equations can be determined by linear stability analysis. The critical points of the equation (where ) and the eigenvalues and eigenvectors of the Jacobian matrix are tabulated below.

See also 
Emden–Chandrasekhar equation
Chandrasekhar's white dwarf equation

References

Further reading

External links 
 

Astrophysics
Ordinary differential equations